Uchtites is a genus of ammonoid cephalopods included in the anarcestid family Acanthoclymeniidae that lived during the Devonian period.  Its shell is lenticular, flat sided, with a tight umbilicus and sharp ventral keel bordered by weak nodules in adult specimens.  The suture has a trifid ventral, rounded outer lateral, weak rounded inner lateral and wedge shaped dorsal lobe.

Acanthoclymenia, Gogocers, Nordiceras, and Ponticeras are related genera.  The type species is Gephyroceras syrjanicum Holzapfel, 1899.

References 

 Uchtites in Goniat on line 
 Uchtites in Paleobiology db 

Agoniatitida
Ammonite genera
Late Devonian ammonites
Fossils of Russia